Dante Di Loreto is an American film and television producer most notable for executive producing Glee and American Horror Story.  He is a two-time Primetime Emmy Award winner and for his work on Temple Grandin and The Normal Heart.  He has also won a Daytime Emmy Award for his work on My Louisiana Sky.  DiLoreto was the President of Ryan Murphy Television; and the President of Television at Chernin Entertainment. and now he's the president of US Scripted Entertainment for Fremantle.

Early life and education 
Di Loreto was raised in Santa Barbara, California. He attended the University of California, Santa Barbara as an undergraduate in the '70s. While a student, Di Loreto served as the internal vice president for the Associated Students of the University of California, Santa Barbara. He graduated from UCSB in 1984.

Di Loreto also holds an M.F.A. from the AFI Conservatory obtained in 1991.

Career

Start in acting 
Di Loreto attempted to break into Hollywood in the mid-80's as an actor.  He moved to production in the early '90s.

Move to production 
Di Loreto supervised film development and US theatrical operations for Bill Kenwright Ltd., the largest production company in the United Kingdom.  Di Loreto later produced several shows for cable and broadcast television as well as a selection of films.  His production credits include Pretty/Handsome, My Louisiana Sky, Temple Grandin and Die, Mommie, Die!, which was awarded the Sundance Film Festival’s Special Jury Prize.

Partnership with Ryan Murphy 
Di Loreto joined up with Ryan Murphy on a number of different projects, most notably Glee and American Horror Story.  Additionally, he's worked on The New Normal and The Glee Project.  He is currently the President of Ryan Murphy Television. Di Loreto made his directorial debut with the season six episode "Transitioning".

Personal life 
Di Loreto serves as a board member for Direct Relief and Center Theatre Group.

He currently resides in Los Angeles, California, and has twin sons.

Awards 
 Primetime Emmy Award for Outstanding Television Movie for Temple Grandin (2010)
 Primetime Emmy Award for Outstanding Television Movie for The Normal Heart (2014)
 Tony Award for Best Musical for Dear Evan Hansen (2016)

References

External links 

 
 FX biography
 HBO biography

Living people
American television producers
Primetime Emmy Award winners
Tony Award winners
University of California, Santa Barbara alumni
Year of birth missing (living people)